Muhammadu Mustapha Faal (born 1 July 1997) is an English professional footballer who plays as a forward for Havant & Waterlooville.

Career
Faal began his career in the youth team at Chingford-based Ryan before completing a scholarship at Boreham Wood from 2013 to 2015. He then joined Italian club L'Aquila in the 2015–16 season. He played eight times in Lega Pro and Serie D, and also played in the Promozione on loan at San Gregorio, before returning to England and joining Waltham Forest at the start of the 2017–18 season. After only one game, he joined Dulwich Hamlet, where he played 25 times in all competitions and scored six times. Faal joined Kingstonian on loan in March 2018 where he scored seven times in eight games. The loan was made permanent at the end of the season.

Faal joined Enfield Town in December 2018. After only five appearances in the remainder of the 2018–19 season, he went on trial at Dumbarton before returning to North London and scoring 24 goals in 25 games in all competitions in the first half of the 2019–20 season before joining Bolton Wanderers on an 18-month contract on 6 January 2020. He made his debut on 11 January in a 0–2 defeat against Rochdale, coming on as a substitute for Sonny Graham in the 66th minute. After spending the first few months of the 2020–21 season injured, Faal joined Barnet on a season-long loan on 6 November 2020, with an option to make the deal permanent in January. On 19 May 2021, Bolton announced that he would be released at the end of his contract. Faal re-joined Enfield Town in August 2021. His first game came on 14 August where he scored twice in a 4–2 win against Carshalton Athletic. On 2 August 2022, Faal joined National League South club Havant & Waterloovile following the expiration of his contract with Enfield Town.

Personal life
Faal is the cousin of England international Joe Gomez. He is eligible to play for Gambia.

Career statistics

References

1997 births
Living people
People from the London Borough of Hackney
Black British sportspeople
Association football forwards
English footballers
Boreham Wood F.C. players
L'Aquila Calcio 1927 players
Walthamstow F.C. players
Dulwich Hamlet F.C. players
Kingstonian F.C. players
Enfield Town F.C. players
Bolton Wanderers F.C. players
Barnet F.C. players
Havant & Waterlooville F.C. players
Serie C players
Serie D players
Isthmian League players
English Football League players
National League (English football) players
Essex Senior Football League players
English expatriate footballers
English expatriates in Italy
Expatriate footballers in Italy
English people of Gambian descent